Tang Zard-e Gelal (also Romanized as Tang Zard-e Gelāl; also known as Tang Zard) is a village in Chin Rural District, Ludab District, Boyer-Ahmad County, Kohgiluyeh and Boyer-Ahmad Province, Iran. At the 2006 census, its population was 27, in 5 families.

References 

Populated places in Boyer-Ahmad County